Rosa canina, commonly known as the dog rose, is a variable climbing, wild rose species native to Europe, northwest Africa, and western Asia.

Description
Its stems are covered with small, sharp, hooked prickles, which aid it in climbing. 
The leaves are pinnate, with 5–7 leaflets. Leaves have a delicious fragrance, when bruised.

The dog rose blooms from June to July, with sweet scented flowers which are usually pale pink, but can vary between a deep pink and white. As other roses it has a quintuscial aestivation (see sketch A in diagram). Unusually though of its five sepals, when viewed from underneath two are whiskered on both sides, two are quite smooth and one is whiskered (or bearded) on one side only.
Flowers mature into an oval, red-orange hip.

The dog rose is hardy to zone 3 in the UK (USDA hardiness zone 3-7), tolerates maritime exposure and grows well in a sunny position, grows even in heavy clay soils, but like all roses dislikes water-logged soils or very dry sites. In deep shade it usually fails to flower and fruit.

It can be confused with fieldbriar Rosa agrestis, and sweetbriar Rosa rubiginosa.

Classification

Classical writers did not acknowledge Rosa canina as a rose, but called it Cynorrhodon from the Greek "kunórodon". In 1538, Turner called it "Cynosbatos : wild hep or brere tree".  Yet in 1551, Matthias de l'Obel classified it as a rose under the name of "Canina Rosa odorata et silvestris" in his herbal "Rubus canis: Brere bush or hep tree" .

From a 2013 DNA analysis using amplified fragment length polymorphisms of wild-rose samples from a transect across Europe (900 samples from section Caninae, and 200 from other sections), it has been suggested that the following named species are best considered as part of a single Rosa canina species complex:
 R. balsamica Besser
 R. caesia Sm.
 R. corymbifera Borkh.
 R. dumalis Bechst.
 R. montana Chaix
 R. stylosa Desv.
 R. subcanina (Christ) Vuk.
 R. subcollina (Christ) Vuk.
 R. × irregularis Déségl. & Guillon

Numerous cultivars have been named, though few are common in cultivation. The cultivar Rosa canina 'Assisiensis' is the only dog rose without thorns.

Pests and diseases

The dog rose can be attacked by aphids, leafhoppers, glasshouse Red Spider Mite, scale insects, caterpillars, rose leaf-rolling sawfly, and leaf-cutting Bee.

When a gall wasp lays eggs into a leaf axillary or terminal bud the plant develops a chemically induced distortion known as rose gall (see photo).

Buds and leaves may be eaten by rabbits and deer, despite the thorns.

It may be affected by rose rust (see photo) and powdery mildews.

It is notably susceptible to honey fungus.

Cultivation and uses
The flesh (shells) of rose hips from dog roses contain high levels of antioxidants, mainly polyphenols and vitamin C, as well as carotenoids and vitamins B and E along with natural sugars, organic acids, polyunsaturated fatty acids, phenolics, and essential oil, making them excellent for consumption. Rose hip essential oil is composed mainly of alcohols, monoterpenes and sesquiterpenes.

The fruit is used to make syrup, tea, preserves (jam and marmalade), used in the making of pies, stews, and wine. The flowers can be made into a syrup, or can be eaten in salads, or candied or preserved in vinegar, honey and brandy. It has been grown or encouraged in the wild for the production of vitamin C from its fruit, especially during conditions of scarcity or during wartime. During World War II in the United States, Rosa canina was planted in victory gardens, and can still be found growing throughout the country, including roadsides and in wet, sandy areas along the coastlines.During World War II the British relied on rose hips and hops as the sources for their vitamins A and C and it was a common British wartime expression to say  "We are getting by on our hips and hops."

In Poland, the petals are used to make jam, particularly suitable for filling doughnuts.

In Bulgaria, where it grows in abundance, the hips are used to make a sweet wine as well as tea.

The hips are used as a flavouring in Cockta, a soft drink made in Slovenia.

Forms of this plant are used as stocks for the grafting or budding of cultivated roses.

Genetics
Dog roses have an unusual kind of meiosis which is sometimes called permanent odd polyploidy, although it can also occur with even polyploidy (e.g. in tetraploids or hexaploids). Regardless of ploidy level, only seven bivalents are formed leaving the other chromosomes as univalents. Univalents are included in egg cells, but not in pollen. Similar processes occur in some other organisms. Dog roses are most commonly pentaploid, i.e. five times the base number of seven chromosomes for the genus Rosa, but may be tetraploid or hexaploid as well.

Name and etymology
The botanical name is derived from the common names 'dog rose' or similar in several European languages, including classical Latin and ancient (Hellenistic period) Greek.
The Roman naturalist Pliny attributed the name dog rose to a belief that the plant's root could cure the bite of a mad dog. It is not clear if the dogs were rabid.
According to The Oxford Dictionary of Phrase and Fable, the English name is a direct translation of the plant's name from classical Latin, rosa canina, itself a translation of the Greek κυνόροδον ('kunórodon'); It is known to have been used to treat the bite of rabid dogs in the 18th and 19th centuries. The origin of its name may be related to the hooked prickles on the plant that have resemblance to a dog's canines.
It is sometimes considered that the word 'dog' has a disparaging meaning in this context, indicating 'worthless' as compared with cultivated garden roses.

Invasive species
Dog rose is an invasive species in the high country of New Zealand. It was recognised as displacing native vegetation as early as 1895 although the Department of Conservation does not consider it to be a conservation threat.

The dog rose is a declared weed in Australia under the Natural Resources Management Act, 2004 as the plant out-competes native vegetation, provides shelter to pests such as foxes and rabbits, is unpalatable to stock, large shrubs are resistant to grazing, therefore do not get eaten by farm animals. The dog rose invades native bushland therefore reducing biodiversity and the presence of desirable pasture species. It is a biosecurity risk as it hosts fruit fly.
 
Birds and wild fruit eating animals are the main cause of seed dispersal. The plant seeds can also be carried in the hooves or fur of stock animals. They may also be carried by waterways.

In culture

The dog rose was the stylised rose of medieval European heraldry. It is the county flower of Hampshire, and Ireland's County Leitrim is nicknamed "The Wild Rose County" due to the prevalence of the dog rose in the area. Legend states the Thousand-year Rose or Hildesheim Rose, which climbs against a wall of Hildesheim Cathedral, dates back to the establishment of the diocese in 815.

The first recorded significance of the flower dates back hundreds of years ago to The Academy of Floral Games (founded in 1323), which gifted poets a sprig of dog rose to reward them for their literary excellence. Due to this ritual, the branches became increasingly popular and can be found frequently mentioned in several famous poems. Most prevalent in the United Kingdom, William Shakespeare wrote about the flower in "A Mid-Summer Night's Dream", which in his time was called eglantine, though it can now also refer to Rosa rubiginosa (Sweet brier)

Oberon, A Midsummer Night's Dream, Act II, Scene I quoting his words: "With sweet musk-roses and with eglantine."

Symbolically, the meaning of this shrub is quite extensive since the two dominating themes surrounding the flower are pain and pleasure.

An old riddle is called "The Five Brethren of the Rose":

On a summer's day, in sultry weather
Five Brethren were born together
Two had beards and two had none
And the other had but half a one.

The riddle contains an effective way of identifying the differing roses of the canina group, where the brethren refers to the five sepals of the dog-rose, two of which are whiskered on both sides, two quite smooth and the last one whiskered on one side only.

The flower is one of the national symbols of Romania.

References

Further reading
Flora Europaea: Rosa canina Royal Botanic Garden Edinburgh
Blamey, M. & Grey-Wilson, C. (1989). Flora of Britain and Northern Europe. Hodder & Stoughton. .
Vedel, H. & Lange, J. (1960). Trees and bushes. Metheun, London.
Graham G.S. & Primavesi A.L. (1993). Roses of Great Britain and Ireland. B.S.B.I. Handbook No. 7. Botanical Society of the British Isles, London.

External links

 

canina
Medicinal plants
Flora of Europe
Flora of North Africa
Flora of Western Asia
Flora of the Pyrenees
Flora of Italy
Flora of Lebanon
Flora of Spain
Flora of Ukraine
Plants described in 1753
Taxa named by Carl Linnaeus
National symbols of Romania
National symbols of Moldova